Centre is one of the four multi-member constituencies of the Chamber of Deputies, the national legislature of Luxembourg. The constituency was established in 1919 following the introduction of proportional representation for elections to the Chamber of Deputies. It consists of the cantons of Luxembourg and Mersch. The constituency currently elects 21 of the 60 members of the Chamber of Deputies using the open party-list proportional representation electoral system. At the 2018 general election it had 72,986 registered electors.

Electoral system
Centre currently elects 21 of the 60 members of the Chamber of Deputies using the open party-list proportional representation electoral system. Electors votes for candidates rather than parties and may cast as many votes as the number of deputies to be elected from the constituency. They may vote for an entire party list or individual candidates and may cast up to two votes for an individual candidate. If the party list contains fewer candidates than the number of deputies to be elected, the elector may vote for candidates from other lists as long as their total number of votes does not exceed the number of deputies to be elected. The ballot paper is invalidated if the elector cast more votes than the number of deputies to be elected from the constituency. Split-ticket voting (panachage) is permitted.

The votes received by each party's candidates are aggregated and seats are allocated to each party using the Hagenbach-Bischoff quota.

Election results

Summary

Detailed

2010s

2018
Results of the 2018 general election held on 14 October 2018:

The following candidates were elected:
Diane Adehm (CSV), 18,010 votes; Marc Angel (LSAP), 10,260 votes; Guy Arendt (DP), 13,931 votes; François Bausch (DG), 19,887 votes; Simone Beissel (DP), 14,630 votes; François Benoy (DG), 9,830 votes; Xavier Bettel (DP), 30,774 votes; Corinne Cahen (DP), 19,471 votes; Sven Clement (PPLU), 8,007 votes; Paul Galles (CSV), 16,942 votes; Marc Lies (CSV), 17,573 votes; Charles Margue (DG), 9,515 votes; Laurent Mosar (CSV), 17,210 votes; Lydie Polfer (DP), 18,934 votes; Roy Reding (ADR), 6,319 votes; Viviane Reding (CSV), 17,922 votes; Etienne Schneider (LSAP), 16,871 votes; Sam Tanson (DG), 17,290 votes; David Wagner (DL), 8,988 votes; Serge Wilmes (CSV), 20,809 votes; and Claude Wiseler (CSV), 27,388 votes.

2013
Results of the 2013 general election held on 20 October 2013:

The following candidates were elected:
Diane Adehm (CSV), 18,665 votes; Marc Angel (LSAP), 10,465 votes; François Bausch (DG), 11,598 votes; Simone Beissel (DP), 14,477 votes; Xavier Bettel (DP), 32,064 votes; Anne Brasseur (DP), 17,641 votes; Corinne Cahen (DP), 13,829 votes; Franz Fayot (LSAP), 8,468 votes; Luc Frieden (CSV), 29,441 votes; Alex Krieps (DP), 12,989 votes; Marc Lies (CSV), 18,167 votes; Viviane Loschetter (DG), 8,535 votes; Paul-Henri Meyers (CSV), 19,162 votes; Laurent Mosar (CSV), 21,495 votes; Marcel Oberweis (CSV), 18,400 votes; Lydie Polfer (DP), 18,637 votes; Roy Reding (ADR), 5,622 votes; Etienne Schneider (LSAP), 19,682 votes; Justin Turpel (DL), 3,737 votes; Serge Wilmes (CSV), 18,949 votes; and Claude Wiseler (CSV), 26,590 votes.

2000s

2009
Results of the 2009 general election held on 7 June 2009:

The following candidates were elected:
Claude Adam (DG), 9,161 votes; François Bausch (DG), 17,510 votes; Xavier Bettel (DP), 19,671 votes; Anne Brasseur (DP), 16,692 votes; Mady Delvaux-Stehres (LSAP), 14,585 votes; Ben Fayot (LSAP), 13,922 votes; Luc Frieden (CSV), 41,889 votes; Paul Helminger (DP), 16,223 votes; Jacques-Yves Henckes (ADR), 6,158 votes; Jean-Pierre Klein (LSAP), 9,820 votes; Jeannot Krecké (LSAP), 25,650 votes; Viviane Loschetter (DG), 10,097 votes; Mill Majerus (CSV), 16,620 votes; Martine Mergen (CSV), 18,454 votes; Paul-Henri Meyers (CSV), 18,146 votes; Laurent Mosar (CSV), 22,116 votes; Marcel Oberweis (CSV), 18,057 votes; Lydie Polfer (DP), 16,402 votes; Jean-Louis Schiltz (CSV), 23,927 votes; Lucien Thiel (CSV), 20,799 votes; and Claude Wiseler (CSV), 31,649 votes.

2004
Results of the 2004 general election held on 13 June 2004:

The following candidates were elected:
Claude Adam (DG), 7,339 votes; François Bausch (DG), 19,502 votes; Xavier Bettel (DP), 12,069 votes; Niki Bettendorf (DP), 12,332 votes; Anne Brasseur (DP), 19,355 votes; Mady Delvaux-Stehres (LSAP), 14,298 votes; Ben Fayot (LSAP), 12,531 votes; Colette Flesch (DP), 11,924 votes; Luc Frieden (CSV), 41,908 votes; Marie-Thérèse Gantenbein-Koullen (CSV), 16,428 votes; Robert Goebbels (LSAP), 14,175 votes; Jacques-Yves Henckes (ADR), 7,502 votes; Erna Hennicot-Schoepges (CSV), 17,536 votes; Jeannot Krecké (LSAP), 19,391 votes; Viviane Loschetter (DG), 10,434 votes; Paul-Henri Meyers (CSV), 17,061 votes; Laurent Mosar (CSV), 20,993 votes; Lydie Polfer (DP), 28,206 votes; Jean-Louis Schiltz (CSV), 16,357 votes; Lucien Thiel (CSV), 16,646 votes; and Claude Wiseler (CSV), 26,009 votes.

1990s

1999
Results of the 1999 general election held on 13 June 1999:

The following candidates were elected:
François Bausch (DG), 9,304 votes; Niki Bettendorf (DP), 18,047 votes; Willy Bourg (CSV), 15,155 votes; Anne Brasseur (DP), 19,564 votes; Mady Delvaux-Stehres (LSAP), 13,537 votes; Ben Fayot (LSAP), 10,898 votes; Colette Flesch (DP), 17,515 votes; Luc Frieden (CSV), 24,701 votes; Robert Goebbels (LSAP), 18,207 votes; Fernand Greisen (ADR), 5,524 votes; Paul Helminger (DP), 16,914 votes; Jacques-Yves Henckes (ADR), 7,961 votes; Erna Hennicot-Schoepges (CSV), 15,469 votes; Jeannot Krecké (LSAP), 15,436 votes; Alex Krieps (DP), 14,794 votes; Lydie Polfer (DP), 28,469 votes; Jean-Paul Rippinger (DP), 14,372 votes; Viviane Reding (CSV), 14,778 votes; Alphonse Theis (CSV), 15,647 votes; Renée Wagener (DG), 9,686 votes; and Claude Wiseler (CSV), 14,515 votes.

1994
Results of the 1994 general election held on 12 June 1994:

The following candidates were elected:
Niki Bettendorf (DP), 16,174 votes; Willy Bourg (CSV), 18,530 votes; Anne Brasseur (DP), 18,156 votes; Mady Delvaux-Stehres (LSAP), 18,641 votes; Ben Fayot (LSAP), 12,586 votes; Marc Fischbach (CSV), 17,519 votes; Colette Flesch (DP), 19,352 votes; Raymond Gibéryen (ADR), 5,718 votes; Robert Goebbels (LSAP), 16,159 votes; Paul Helminger (DP), 15,795 votes; Jacques-Yves Henckes (ADR), 5,354 votes; Erna Hennicot-Schoepges (CSV), 22,321 votes; Jeannot Krecké (LSAP), 13,694 votes; Astrid Lulling (CSV), 15,790 votes; Carlo Meintz (DP), 15,814 votes; Paul-Henri Meyers (CSV), 14,259 votes; Lydie Polfer (DP), 26,708 votes; Jacques Santer (CSV), 25,992 votes; Alphonse Theis (CSV), 16,002 votes; Renée Wagener (GLEI-GAP), 7,322 votes; and Jup Weber (GLEI-GAP), 14,247 votes.

1980s

1989
Results of the 1989 general election held on 18 June 1989:

The following candidates were elected:
Thers Bodé (GAP), 3,749 votes; Willy Bourg (CSV), 18,856 votes; Anne Brasseur (DP), 16,835 votes; Mady Delvaux-Stehres (LSAP), 17,245 votes; Ben Fayot (LSAP), 13,394 votes; Marc Fischbach (CSV), 21,511 votes; Colette Flesch (DP), 25,592 votes; Pierre Frieden (CSV), 17,117 votes; Robert Goebbels (LSAP), 14,944 votes; René Hengel (LSAP), 13,617 votes; Erna Hennicot-Schoepges (CSV), 19,408 votes; René Konen (DP), 13,825 votes; Émile Krieps (DP), 15,031 votes; Robert Krieps (LSAP), 13,479 votes; Carlo Meintz (DP), 14,504 votes; Lydie Polfer (DP), 26,885 votes; Fernand Rau (CSV), 19,613 votes; Jacques Santer (CSV), 30,499 votes; Josy Simon (5/6), 5,440 votes; Alphonse Theis (CSV), 18,425 votes; and Jup Weber (GLEI), 13,872 votes.

1984
Results of the 1984 general election held on 17 June 1984:

The following candidates were elected:
Hary Ackermann (LSAP), 14,064 votes; Léon Bollendorff (CSV), 21,819 votes; Anne Brasseur (DP), 15,475 votes; Nicolas Estgen (CSV), 19,467 votes; Marc Fischbach (CSV), 23,332 votes; Colette Flesch (DP), 29,247 votes; Robert Goebbels (LSAP), 15,973 votes; Jean Hamilius (DP), 16,442 votes; René Hengel (LSAP), 17,088 votes; Erna Hennicot-Schoepges (CSV), 20,359 votes; René Kollwelter (LSAP), 14,961 votes; René Konen (DP), 18,938 votes; Émile Krieps (DP), 19,768 votes; Robert Krieps (LSAP), 20,854 votes; Astrid Lulling (CSV), 22,675 votes; Carlo Meintz (DP), 16,474 votes; Nicolas Mosar (CSV), 19,298 votes; Ernest Mühlen (CSV), 19,739 votes; Lydie Polfer (DP), 26,368 votes; Fernand Rau (CSV), 21,790 votes; Jacques Santer (CSV), 32,241 votes; Jup Weber (GAP), 4,106 votes; and Joseph Wohlfart (LSAP), 15,961 votes.

1970s

1979
Results of the 1979 general election held on 10 June 1979:

The following candidates were elected:
Léon Bollendorff (CSV), 23,109 votes; Marc Fischbach (CSV), 20,955 votes; Colette Flesch (DP), 28,580 votes; Jean Gremling (SI), 10,621 votes; Jean Hamilius (DP), 19,013 votes; Camille Hellinckx (DP), 17,172 votes; René Hengel (LSAP), 12,878 votes; René Konen (DP), 18,606 votes; Émile Krieps (DP), 20,181 votes; Robert Krieps (LSAP), 13,748 votes; Georges Margue (CSV), 21,347 votes; Carlo Meintz (DP), 16,970 votes; Nicolas Mosar (CSV), 20,995 votes; Ernest Mühlen (CSV), 23,003 votes; Fernand Rau (CSV), 21,133 votes; Jacques Santer (CSV), 26,570 votes; Gaston Thorn (DP), 31,246 votes; René van den Bulcke (LSAP), 11,354 votes; Pierre Werner (CSV), 32,502 votes; and Joseph Wohlfart (LSAP), 12,954 votes.

1974
Results of the 1974 general election held on 26 May 1974:

The following candidates were elected:
Léon Bollendorff (CSV), 17,619 votes; Albert Bousser (SDP), 6,034 votes; Emile Burggraff (CSV), 18,458 votes; Colette Flesch (DP), 35,707 votes; Pierre Grégoire (CSV), 18,908 votes; Jean Gremling (LSAP), 14,419 votes; Camille Hellinckx (DP), 18,851 votes; René Hengel (LSAP), 16,268 votes; René Konen (DP), 20,726 votes; Émile Krieps (DP), 21,240 votes; Robert Krieps (LSAP), 15,014 votes; Georges Margue (CSV), 16,473 votes; Camille Polfer (DP), 22,689 votes; Jacques Santer (CSV), 20,123 votes; Eugène Schaus (DP), 20,691 votes; Gaston Thorn (DP), 38,218 votes; Dominique Urbany (KPL), 4,672 votes; René van den Bulcke (LSAP), 14,743 votes; Pierre Werner (CSV), 29,918 votes; and Joseph Wohlfart (LSAP), 16,271 votes.

1960s

1968
Results of the 1968 general election held on 15 December 1968:

The following candidates were elected:
Tony Biever (CSV), 18,693 votes; Léon Bollendorff (CSV), 19,609 votes; Paul Elvinger (DP), 15,262 votes; Madeleine Frieden-Kinnen (CSV), 22,741 votes; Pierre Grégoire (CSV), 21,886 votes; Jean Hamilius (DP), 12,769 votes; René Hengel (LSAP), 16,048 votes; Georges Margue (CSV), 18,789 votes; Nicolas Mosar (CSV), 18,387 votes; Camille Polfer (DP), 12,719 votes; Eugène Schaus (DP), 17,353 votes; Gaston Thorn (DP), 19,799 votes; Dominique Urbany (KPL), 6,879 votes; René van den Bulcke (LSAP), 15,337 votes; Antoine Wehenkel (LSAP), 15,637 votes; Pierre Werner (CSV), 25,345 votes; Paul Wilwertz (LSAP), 16,109 votes; and Joseph Wohlfart (LSAP), 17,919 votes.

1964
Results of the 1964 general election held on 7 June 1964:

The following candidates were elected:
Tony Biever (CSV), 18,725 votes; Albert Bousser (LSAP), 18,053 votes; Paul Elvinger (DP), 11,186 votes; Marcel Fischbach (CSV), 18,780 votes; Pierre Grégoire (CSV), 21,557 votes; René Hengel (LSAP), 17,254 votes; Alphonse Hildgen (LSAP), 18,605 votes; Nicolas Kollwelter (CSV), 17,975 votes; Georges Margue (CSV), 18,186 votes; Nicolas Mosar (CSV), 17,343 votes; Jean-Pierre Reisdoerfer (MIP), 3,904 votes; Eugène Schaus (DP), 14,002 votes; Gaston Thorn (DP), 11,301 votes; Dominique Urbany (KPL), 6,643 votes; Adrien van Kauvenbergh (LSAP), 17,958 votes; Antoine Wehenkel (LSAP), 19,473 votes; Pierre Werner (CSV), 23,208 votes; and Joseph Wohlfart (LSAP), 21,691 votes.

1950s

1959
Results of the 1959 general election held on 1 February 1959:

The following candidates were elected:
Tony Biever (CSV), 21,991 votes; Victor Bodson (LSAP), 17,322 votes; Albert Bousser (LSAP), 17,517 votes; Paul Elvinger (DP), 15,702 votes; Marcel Fischbach (CSV), 22,222 votes; Pierre Frieden (CSV), 26,878 votes; Pierre Grégoire (CSV), 21,403 votes; Émile Hamilius (DP), 21,669 votes; Lucien Koenig (DP), 17,576 votes; Eugène Schaus (DP), 23,218 votes; Henri Sinner (CSV), 19,245 votes; Antoine Wehenkel (LSAP), 17,707 votes; Pierre Werner (CSV), 23,773 votes; Paul Wilwertz (LSAP), 18,999 votes; Joseph Wohlfart (LSAP), 18,019 votes; and Roger Wolter (DP), 14,471 votes.

1954
Results of the 1954 general election held on 30 May 1954:

The following candidates were elected:
Jean-Pierre Bauer (LSAP), 16,797 votes; Tony Biever (CSV), 22,589 votes; Victor Bodson (LSAP), 20,995 votes; Albert Bousser (LSAP), 17,629 votes; Marcel Fischbach (CSV), 21,624 votes; Pierre Frieden (CSV), 25,757 votes; Pierre Grégoire (CSV), 22,065 votes; Jean Gremling (LSAP), 17,871 votes; Émile Hamilius (GD), 14,958 votes; Lucien Koenig (GD), 12,059 votes; Émile Reuter (CSV), 23,904 votes; Nicolas Rollinger (CSV), 24,925 votes; Eugène Schaus (GD), 12,362 votes; Adrien van Kauvenbergh (LSAP), 17,922 votes; Antoine Wehenkel (LSAP), 18,020 votes; and Pierre Werner (CSV), 27,008 votes.

1951
Results of the 1951 general election held on 3 June 1951:

The following candidates were elected:
Jean-Pierre Bauer (LSAP), 20,104 votes; Tony Biever (CSV), 18,126 votes; Victor Bodson (LSAP), 22,609 votes; Albert Bousser (LSAP), 21,115 votes; Pierre Frieden (CSV), 21,831 votes; Émile Hamilius (GD), 16,278 votes; Lucien Koenig (GD), 12,398 votes; Maurice Leick (LSAP), 19,055 votes; Fernand Loesch (CSV), 18,227 votes; Émile Reuter (CSV), 22,158 votes; Nicolas Rollinger (CSV), 19,276 votes; Eugène Schaus (GD), 13,517 votes; Adrien van Kauvenbergh (LSAP), 20,983 votes; Antoine Wehenkel (LSAP), 19,846 votes; Camille Welter (CSV), 17,668 votes; and Paul Wilwertz (LSAP), 21,283 votes.

1940s

1945
Results of the 1945 general election held on 21 October 1945:

The following candidates were elected:
Jean-Pierre Bauer (LAP), 12,806 votes; Tony Biever (CSV), 19,433 votes; Victor Bodson (LAP), 15,009 votes; Gaston Diderich (GPD), 16,353 votes; Pierre Frieden (CSV), 23,183 votes; Émile Hamilius (GPD), 18,074 votes; Gustave Jacquemart (GPD), 14,404 votes; Camille Kasel (CSV), 19,228 votes; Jean-Pierre Kohner (LAP), 15,843 votes; Guillaume Konsbruck (CSV), 26,316 votes; Fernand Loesch (CSV), 21,768 votes; François Neu (LAP), 12,805 votes; Eugène Schaus (GPD), 15,010 votes; Lambert Schaus (CSV), 19,627 votes; and Fritz Schneider (KPL), 5.298 votes.

1930s

1937
Results of the 1937 general election held on 6 June 1937:

The following candidates were elected:
Jean-Pierre Bauer (LAP), 13,154 votes; Tony Biever (RP), 14,999 votes; Victor Bodson (LAP), 16,473 votes; Marcel Cahen (RLP), 10,295 votes; Gaston Diderich (RLP), 12,608 votes; Émile Hamilius (RP), 16,980 votes; Venant Hildgen (LAP), 12,552 votes; Nicolas Jacoby (RP), 14,790 votes; Jean-Pierre Kohner (LAP), 17,293 votes; Fernand Loesch (RP), 16,444 votes; Leo Müller (DL), 13,048 votes; François Neu (LAP), 14,154 votes; Jean Origer (RP), 18,204 votes; Albert Philippe (RP), 15,913 votes; and Pierre Prüm (DL), 12,620 votes.

1931
Results of the 1931 general election held on 7 June 1931:

The following candidates were elected:
François Altwies (Right), 14,591 votes; René Blum (LAP), 13,793 votes; Marcel Cahen (Radical), 9,566 votes; Gaston Diderich (RSP), 11,696 votes; Nicolas Jacoby (Right), 14,973 votes; Jean-Pierre Kohner (OP), 8,790 votes; Norbert Le Gallais (RSP), 7,974 votes; Nicolaus Mackel (Right), 14,149 votes; Dominique Moes (LAP), 8,824 votes; François Neu (LAP), 10,154 votes; Jean Origer (Right), 16,879 votes; Tony Pemmers (Radical), 8,324 votes; Albert Philippe (Right), 16,110 votes; and Auguste Thorn (Right), 14,546 votes.

1920s

1925
Results of the 1925 general election held on 1 March 1925:

The following candidates were elected:
François Altwies (RP), 15,445 votes; Robert Brasseur (LL), 6,833 votes; Marcel Cahen (VL), 16,674 votes; Gaston Diderich (VL), 17,097 votes; Jean-Pierre Ecker (RP), 12,508 votes; Jacques Gallé (VL), 12,140 votes; Jean Hansen (LAP), 5,620 votes; Jean-Pierre Kohner (ONV), 7,764 votes; Nicolas Ludovicy (VL), 12,509 votes; Jean Origer (RP), 12,687 votes; Albert Philippe (RP), 14,043 votes; Marguerite Thomas-Clement (VL), 10,569 votes; and Auguste Thorn (RP), 13,056 votes.

1922
Results of the 1922 general election held on 28 May 1922:

The following candidates were elected:
François Altwies (RP), 15,040 votes; Robert Brasseur (LDL), 15,806 votes; Marcel Cahen (LDL), 15,363 votes; Gaston Diderich (LDL), 17,036 votes; Jean-Pierre Ecker (RP), 12,888 votes; Alphonse Eichhorn (RP), 13,001 votes; Jacques Gallé (LDL), 13,405 votes; Nicolas Jacoby (RP), 13,563 votes; Jean-Pierre Kohner (RP), 14,227 votes; Norbert Le Gallais (LDL), 14,348 votes; Nicolas Ludovicy (LDL), 13,918 votes; Émile Mark (SP), 5,953 votes; and Albert Philippe (RP), 15,156 votes.

1910s

1919
Results of the 1919 general election held on 26 October 1919:

The following candidates were elected:
François Altwies (RP), 17,376 votes; Robert Brasseur (RL), 10,325 votes; Raymond de Waha (RP), 15,211 votes; Gaston Diderich (RL), 10,615 votes; Alphonse Eichhorn (RP), 13,885 votes; Venant Hildgen (SP), 6,846 votes; Nicolas Jacoby (RP), 13,981 votes; Jean-Pierre Kohner (RP), 13,885 votes; Norbert Le Gallais (RL), 10,220 votes; Nicolas Ludovicy (RL), 12,328 votes; Albert Philippe (RP), 16,038 votes; Michel Schettlé (SP), 8,501 votes; and Marguerite Thomas-Clement (SP), 7,589 votes.

References

1919 establishments in Luxembourg
Chamber of Deputies (Luxembourg) constituencies
Constituencies established in 1919
Chamber of Deputies constituency
Chamber of Deputies constituency